Coco (/koʊ.koʊ/) is a unisex given name and nickname. It may refer to:

Female
 Coco Love Alcorn, Canadian singer
 Coco Argentée (born 1982), Cameroonian singer-songwriter
 Coco Austin (born 1979), American model and spouse of Ice-T
 Coco Brandolini d'Adda (born 1979), French-born Italian fashion director
 CoCo Brown (born 1978), American rapper
 Coco Chanel (1883–1971), French fashion designer
 Coco Fusco (born 1960), American artist
 Coco Gauff (born 2004), American tennis player
 CoCo Goodson (born 1990), American soccer defender
 Coco Grayson (born 2000), American actress
 Coco Guzmán (born 1979), Spanish artist
 Coco Hayashi (born 2002), Japanese actress
 Coco Ho (born 1991), professional Hawaiian surfer
 Coco Johnsen (born 1966), American Playboy model and fashion designer
 Coco Jones (born 1998), American pop singer
 Coco Lee (born 1975), Hong Kong-American pop singer
 Coco Lin (born 1995), Hong Kong fencer
 Coco Mbassi (born 1969), Cameroonian musical artist
 Coco Miller (born 1978), American Women's National Basketball Association player
 Coco Montrese (born 1974), American drag queen
 Coco Moodysson (born 1970), Swedish auto biographer
 Coco Rocha (born 1988), Canadian model
 Coco Solid (born 1979), New Zealand writer
 Coco Star (born 1974), English singer-songwriter
 Coco Arayha Suparurk (born 1994), Thai-Austrian model and beauty pageant titleholder
 CoCo Vandeweghe (born 1991), American tennis player
 Colette Kaminski (born 1997), American figure skater

Male
 Coco (footballer) (born 1969), Spanish footballer
 Coco Crisp (born 1979), American baseball outfielder 
 Coco Hotahota (1941-2020), French dancer
 Coco Martin (born 1981), Filipino actor
 Coco Montoya (born 1951), American guitarist
 Coco Navarro (born 1995), American soccer player
 Coco Robicheaux (1947-2011), American musician
 Coco Schumann (1924-2018), German musician
 Coco weAfrica (born 1991), Zimbabwean artist
 Enrique "Coco" Vicéns (1926–2015), Puerto Rican basketball player and politician
 Grégoire Aslan (né Krikor Aslanian; 1908–1982), Swiss-Armenian actor and musician
 Joey Diaz (born 1963), American-Cuban comedian

Lists of people by nickname